Cornelia "Kea" Tiedemann-Bouman (23 November 1903 – 17 November 1998) was a female tennis player from the Netherlands. She won the singles title at the 1927 French Championships, beating Irene Bowder Peacock of South Africa in the final. Bouman was the first and, to this date, the only Dutch woman who has won a Grand Slam singles title.

Bouman additionally won the 1923, 1924, 1925 and 1926 Dutch national tennis championship (singles).

Born in Almelo, Bouman is also the first female Dutch athlete to win an Olympic medal in any sport, when she teamed with Hendrik Timmer to win bronze in mixed doubles at the 1924 Summer Olympics in Paris.

In October 1927 Bouman won the singles title of the inaugural edition of the Pacific Southwest Tennis Championship, defeating Molla Mallory in the final in three sets. In 1929, Bouman teamed with Spain's Lilí Álvarez to win the women's doubles title at the French Championships, precursor of the French Open.

According to A. Wallis Myers of The Daily Telegraph and the Daily Mail, Bouman was ranked in the world top 10 in 1927 and 1928, reaching a career high of world no. 8 in those rankings in 1928.

Bouman was successful in other sports as well. She became the Dutch national champion in golf and played for the national field hockey team.

On 27 January 1931 she married Ir. Wilhelm Tiedemann in Almelo, and shortly afterwards the couple emigrated to Dutch East Indies where they would live for nine years and where Tiedemann worked as a geologist. She had also lived in the United States. Bouman died in Delden, Netherlands.

Grand Slam finals

Singles (1 title)

Doubles (1 title)

Grand Slam singles tournament timeline 

1Through 1923, the French Championships were open only to French nationals. The World Hard Court Championships (WHCC), actually played on clay in Paris or Brussels, began in 1912 and were open to all nationalities. The results from the 1923 edition of that tournament are shown here. The Olympics replaced the WHCC in 1924, as the Olympics were held in Paris. Beginning in 1925, the French Championships were open to all nationalities, with the results shown here beginning with that year.

See also 

 Performance timelines for all female tennis players who reached at least one Grand Slam final

References

External links 

 
 1924 Olympic diploma Kea Bouman

1903 births
1998 deaths
Dutch female tennis players
Dutch female field hockey players
French Championships (tennis) champions
Olympic bronze medalists for the Netherlands
Olympic tennis players of the Netherlands
Sportspeople from Almelo
Tennis players at the 1924 Summer Olympics
Olympic medalists in tennis
Grand Slam (tennis) champions in women's singles
Grand Slam (tennis) champions in women's doubles
Medalists at the 1924 Summer Olympics
20th-century Dutch women